The Aksu (Aqsu) is a river of the Balkhash-Alakol Basin, Kazakhstan. It originates in the Dzungarian Alatau Mountains near the border with China and flows into Lake Balkhash. In Turkic languages, the name 'ak+su' literally means "clean/white water". The Aksu is one of the main rivers of the historic region of Zhetysu.

Course
The river flows north from the border with China before turning north-westward passing by Matay and then northward when it reaches the Saryesik-Atyrau Desert, a large sand desert south of Lake Balkhash. The river empties into Lake Balkhash just west of the Lepsy River on its southern side. Aksu freezes in December and stays icebound until March. Because of irrigation, the river's flow into Lake Balkash is limited.

References 

Rivers of Kazakhstan
Tributaries of Lake Balkhash